Bibb County is the name of two counties in the United States:

Bibb County, Alabama
Bibb County, Georgia